Jonas Jonsson (27 October 1903 – 12 January 1996) was a Swedish shooter who competed in the Olympic games in 1948. He won the bronze medal in London in the 50 metre rifle, prone position category.

References

1903 births
1996 deaths
Swedish male sport shooters
ISSF rifle shooters
Shooters at the 1948 Summer Olympics
Olympic shooters of Sweden
Olympic bronze medalists for Sweden
Olympic medalists in shooting
Medalists at the 1948 Summer Olympics
20th-century Swedish people